Audulf or Audwulf, (Latin: Audulfus) was a Frisian king at the time of the Great Migration, (around 600).

Nowadays historians mostly think that there was a Frisian king in the first half of the 7th century with the name Audulf, containing the words adel and wolf. The land this king ruled was probably the central rivers area of the Netherlands. The written sources do not contain any information of this monarch, but there are some golden coins found with the words “Audulfus” and “Frisia” on them. The land where the Frisian people once lived was at that time divided, each with his own ruler. Excavations in the north of Friesland, in the area called Westergo proved that some kind of power has existed in that time in the province of Friesland.

The coins were found in the Netherlands at Escharen in nearby Arnhem and also in England. Most are dated between 600 and 630. At the beginning of 2006 a coin stamp of Audwulf with the words AUDWULF FRISIA was found in the Frisian village Wijnaldum at the place which earlier was searched for the keningshal of the Frisian kings. 

Another interesting finding that is brought in context with Audulf is the treasure trove of Wiuwert. One of the coins has the inscription VICTORIA AUDUFO, probably made to remember a remarkable victory on another people. Some think this people were the Franks who fought the Frisian for control of the Rhine delta.

Sources
K.P.H. Faber, Audulfus, een Friese Koning, in Fryslân, Nieuwsblad voor geschiedenis en cultuur, no.4, 4e jaargang, December 1998

References 

Medieval Frisian rulers
7th-century monarchs in Europe